The Muzaffarid dynasty was a Muslim dynasty which came to power in Iran following the breakup of the Ilkhanate in the 14th century. At their zenith, they ruled a kingdom comprising Iranian Azerbaijan, Central Persia, and Persian Iraq. The Muzaffarids were known for their support of Arabic literature. Shah Shoja was a poet and wrote in both Arabic and Persian and was said to be capable of memorizing eight verses of Arabic poetry after hearing them read once. While the Muzaffarid ruler of Kirman, Shah Yahya, commissioned the scholar Junyad bin Mahmud Al-Umari to compile an anthology of Arabic poetry and prose for him

Rise to power
The Muzaffarids were originally from Arabia and had settled in Khorasan from the beginning of Caliphal rule there. They have been described as an Arab, Iranian, and Persian dynasty. They stayed in Khorasan up until the Mongol invasion of that province, at which point they fled to Yazd. Serving under the Il-Khans, they gained prominence when Sharaf al-Din Muzaffar was made governor of Maibud. He was tasked with crushing the robber-bands that were roaming around the country.

Sharaf al-Din's son, Mubariz al-Din Muhammad, was brought up at the Il-Khan's court but returned to Maibud upon the death of the Il-Khan Öljeitü. In around 1319 he overthrew the atabeg of Yazd and was subsequently recognized as governor of the city by the central Il-Khan government. Following this he began fighting against the Neguderis, a Mongol tribal group. He managed to face this crisis with a minimum of loss.

In the wake of the loss of Il-Khan authority in central Iran following the death of Abu Sa'id (Ilkhanid dynasty), Mubariz al-Din continued to carry out his expansionary policy. In 1339 or 1340 he invaded the province of Kirman and seized it from its Mongol governor, Qutb al-Din b. Nasir. Kutb al-Din was able to retake the province for a short time after receiving aid from the Kartid dynasty of Herat, but Mubariz al-Din permanently gained control of Kirman in late 1340. The city of Bam was besieged and conquered a few years after this.

After the conquest of Kirman, Mubariz al-Din became a rival of the neighboring Injuids, who controlled Shiraz and Isfahan. Although the Muzaffarids and Injuids had traditionally been on friendly terms with one another, the Injuid Abu Esshaq's desire to gain Kirman led him to start a drawn-out conflict with the Muzaffarids in 1347. He unsuccessfully besieged Yazd (1350–1351), after which his fortunes declined rapidly. Defeated on the field in 1353, Abu Esshaq was forced to take refuge in Shiraz and finally surrender. He managed to escape from Shiraz and fled to Isfahan, but Mubariz al-Din pursued him, took the city and executed the Injuid ruler. Fars and western Iran were now under his control.

With the destruction of Injuid authority, the Muzaffarids were the strongest power in central Iran, and Shiraz was made their capital. Mubariz al-Din's strength was such that when the khan of the Golden Horde, Jani Beg, sent an offer to make him a vassal, he was able to decline. In fact, he pushed on into Azerbaijan, which Jani Beg had conquered in 1357. He defeated the khan's governor Akhichuq and occupied Tabriz, but realized that he could not hold his position against the Jalayirid troops marching from Baghdad and soon retreated. The Jalayirids would therefore maintain a hold on Tabriz, despite further attempts by the Muzaffarids to take it.

Mubariz al-Din was known as a cruel ruler, and soon afterwards 1358, his son Shah Shoja blinded and imprisoned him. A temporary reconciliation was reached, but it failed to last and he died, again in prison, in 1363.

Reign of Shah Shoja

Shah Shoja proved to be a less of a tyrannic figure, but he was constantly fighting with his brothers, causing a long period of instability. In 1363 he marched against his first brother Shah Mahmud, who had been given control of Isfahan, although a peace was soon brokered. In the following year however, Shah Mahmud, with the support of his father-in-law Shaikh Uvais of the Jalayirids, invaded Fars and captured Shiraz. Shah Shoja would not be able to reconquer his capital until 1366. Shah Mahmud would continue to play and influential role in Iranian politics, using his marriage alliance to claim Tabriz from the Jalayirids after Shaikh Uvais died in 1374. He occupied the city but soon gave up after he was struck by illness. He died the next year, allowing Shah Shoja to occupy Isfahan.

Shah Shoja then marched on Tabriz himself, but was forced to turn back when internal conditions in Fars deteriorated. His second brother Shah Muzaffar's son, Shah Yahya, rose in revolt in Isfahan. Having to make peace with the Jalayirids, Shah Shoja offered to marry his son Zain Al-Abidin to a sister of the Jalayirid ruler Husain. The Jalayirids refused the offer and invaded, although Shah Shoja managed to prevent them from getting any further than Sultaniyya. Before dying in 1384, he named his son Zain al-Abidin his successor and his third brother 'Imad ad-Din Ahmad as governor of Kirman. Not satisfied with the arrangement, Shah Yahya advanced against Shiraz, but was expelled from Isfahan by the city's populace and was forced to flee to Yazd. On his deathbed, Shah Shoja wrote a letter to Timur, who was then campaigning in Azerbaijan, in which he gave his sons' loyalty to the conqueror.

Muzaffarid decline

When Zain Al-Abidin succeeded his father, he quickly ignored the declaration of loyalty. Timur therefore marched into the Muzaffarid lands. He came to Isfahan, where the governor gave him control of the city, but a rebellion in the city killed any goodwill Timur had, resulting in a slaughter of the populace. Zain Al-Abidin fled from Shiraz in an attempt to make it to the Jalayirids in Baghdad, who were enemies of Timur. However, he encountered Shah Yahya's brother Shah Mansur, who imprisoned him. Shiraz soon fell to Timur. Shah Mansur and 'Imad ad-Din Ahmad, along with other Muzaffarid princes, went to Shiraz to declare their loyalty, whereupon Timur restored them to their positions. The conqueror soon after returned to Transoxiana; Shiraz was given to Shah Yahya.

Unfortunately, the Mozaffarids soon began to resume their local feuding. Shah Mansur began by expelling Shah Yahya from Shiraz, whereupon Shah Yahya again fled to Yazd. Shah Mansur then conquered Abarquh, but failed to take Isfahan. Meanwhile, Zain al-Abidin escaped from prison and reached Isfahan. An alliance was then formed between Zain al-Abidin, Shah Yahya and 'Imad ad-Din Ahmad against Shah Mansur. The alliance proved to be unstable, however, and when they met Shah Mansur's army at Furg, Shah Yahya failed to show and 'Imad ad-Din Ahmad quickly retreated. The latter met Shah Mansur again, this time at Fasa, but lost and was captured in Ray. He was blinded and imprisoned. Shah Mansur then approached Kirman, where Sultan Ahmad and Shah Yahya had gone after the events at Furg. He offered a common alliance against Timur, but was rebuffed and thereafter returned to Shiraz.

Timur, who while campaigning elsewhere took note of these events, decided in 1392 that a campaign against Shah Mansur was in order. Shah Mansur gained the Sarbadar Muluk as his ally; Muluk was sent to defend Kashan and the Mozaffarid northern front. By March 1393 Timur had advanced down to Shushtar and Dizful, installing a Sarbadar as governor there. He also freed 'Imad-Din Ahmad from imprisonment. Shah Mansur fled Shiraz, but then turned around and met Timur's forces. With an army weakened by desertions, he fought bravely but was forced to retreat. Attempting to reach Shiraz, he was captured by forces of prince Shah Rukh and was decapitated. The other Muzaffarid princes then again swore allegiance to Timur. They were received honorably by the conqueror, but on May 22 in Qumisha they were executed. Only Zain al-Abidin and Sultan Shibli (another son of Shah Shoja) survived the purge; they were sent to Samarkand.

Muzaffarid rulers
 Mubariz al-Din Muhammad (1314–1358)
 Shah Shoja (1358-1364)
 Shah Mahmud (at Isfahan) (1364–1366)
 Shah Shoja (1366-1384)
 Zain al-Abidin (1384–1387)
 Shah Yahya (in Shiraz, 1387–1391)
 Sultan Ahmad (in Kerman, 1387–1391)
 Sultan Abu Ishaq (in Sirajan, 1387–1391)
 Shah Mansur (1391-1393)

See also

 List of kings of Persia
 Yazd, a city dominated by the Mozaffarids
 List of Sunni Muslim dynasties
 Soltan Bakht Agha Mausoleum

Notes

References

Sources

M. Ismail Marcinkowski, Persian Historiography and Geography: Bertold Spuler on Major Works Produced in Iran, the Caucasus, Central Asia, India and Early Ottoman Turkey, with a foreword by Professor Clifford Edmund Bosworth, member of the British Academy, Singapore: Pustaka Nasional, 2003, .

External links

 
States and territories established in 1314
States and territories disestablished in 1393
14th century in Iran
Former countries in the Middle East
Iranian Muslim dynasties
Sunni dynasties